Nectar Lifesciences Limited is a pharmaceutical company in India that manufactures generic drug products. The company has global leadership in several oral and sterile cephalosporin drugs, and has cGMP facilities along with those approved by the European Union and Japan.

History
The company was founded by Mr Sanjiv Goyal and was incorporated in June 1995. The company went public in July 2005 with simultaneous listings on the Bombay Stock Exchange and the National Stock Exchange of India. In 2010 New Silk Route Private Equity invested INR 2.5 billion in the company.

Management

Board of Directors: 

Chairman & Managing Director: Sanjiv Goyal
ED: Dinesh Dua

Market Cap
The current market capitalization is about INR 578.59 cr.

Products
Nectar Lifesciences manufactures oral and sterile active pharmaceutical ingredients, finished dosages and phytochemicals. The company is also in the business of providing pharmaceutical organizations with contract research and manufacturing services. It also manufactures empty hard gelatin capsules.

References

External links
Nectar Lifesciences: Official site

Pharmaceutical companies of India
Companies based in Chandigarh
Pharmaceutical companies established in 1995
1995 establishments in Chandigarh
Companies listed on the National Stock Exchange of India
Companies listed on the Bombay Stock Exchange